The Third Sangam (Tamil: மூன்றாம் சங்கம், Moondram Sangam) (Malayalam: മൂന്നാം സംഘം, Moonnam Sangam) or the Third Academy, also known as the Madurai College of Antiquity, was a historical assembly and the last of the three Tamil Sangams. Established under the aegis of 49 Pandyan kings with 449 participating poets, it ran for 1850 years, ending around the time that Christianity emerged. All surviving Sangam literature comes from this particular Sangam. The seat of the Third Sangam was the city of Madurai.

See also 
 List of Sangam poets
 Dravida Sangha
 Religion in ancient Tamil country
 Sangam landscape
 Madurai Tamil Sangam

Citations

References

 

Ancient Tamil Nadu
Cultural history of Tamil Nadu
Tamil history